Seo Byung-Hwan  (Hangul: 서병환; born 1 June 1984) is a South Korean football player.

Club career
Seo started his professional football career in 2007 with Ulsan Hyundai. During this period, he played in two league games. On 24 December 2008, he became a free agent, ending his two-year stay at the club.

References

External links

1984 births
Living people
South Korean footballers
Ulsan Hyundai FC players
K League 1 players
Association football midfielders